Carlstadt is a borough in Bergen County, in the U.S. state of New Jersey. As of the 2020 United States census, the borough's population was 6,372, an increase of 245 (+4.0%) from the 2010 census count of 6,127, which in turn reflected an increase of 210 (+3.5%) from the 5,917 counted in the 2000 census.

Carlstadt was originally formed as a village by an act of the New Jersey Legislature on March 12, 1860, within Lodi Township. Most sources indicate that the community was named for Dr. Carl Klein, the leader of a group of early German settlers who led the project to establish the community though Henry Gannett stated that the name derived from the city of Karlovac in Croatia, which was known as "Carlstadt" in German. The Borough of Carlstadt was incorporated on June 27, 1894, formally set off from Bergen Township. The borough was formed during the "Boroughitis" phenomenon then sweeping through Bergen County, in which 26 boroughs were formed in the county in 1894 alone.

Geography
According to the United States Census Bureau, the borough had a total area of 4.21 square miles (10.90 km2), including 3.95 square miles (10.22 km2) of land and 0.26 square miles (0.67 km2) of water (6.18%).

Carlstadt is bordered on the south by East Rutherford in Bergen County, Secaucus and North Bergen in Hudson County, on the north by Wood-Ridge and Moonachie (Bergen) to the east by Ridgefield and South Hackensack (Bergen), and to the northwest by Wallington (Bergen).

Demographics

2010 census

The Census Bureau's 2006–2010 American Community Survey showed that (in 2010 inflation-adjusted dollars) median household income was $62,255 (with a margin of error of +/− $9,455) and the median family income was $71,506 (+/− $5,117). Males had a median income of $50,994 (+/− $7,494) versus $41,333 (+/− $6,468) for females. The per capita income for the borough was $30,403 (+/− $3,646). About 7.2% of families and 6.8% of the population were below the poverty line, including 3.0% of those under age 18 and 6.0% of those age 65 or over.

Same-sex couples headed 14 households in 2010, an increase from the 11 counted in 2000.

2000 census
As of the 2000 United States census there were 5,917 people, 2,393 households, and 1,593 families residing in the borough. The population density was 1,496.4 people per square mile (578.4/km2). There were 2,473 housing units at an average density of 625.4 per square mile (241.7/km2). The racial makeup of the borough was 88.90% White, 1.37% African American, 0.08% Native American, 6.19% Asian, 0.02% Pacific Islander, 2.13% from other races, and 1.32% from two or more races. Hispanic or Latino people of any race were 7.99% of the population.

There were 2,393 households, out of which 25.7% had children under the age of 18 living with them, 51.9% were married couples living together, 10.8% had a female householder with no husband present, and 33.4% were non-families. 26.4% of all households were made up of individuals, and 9.6% had someone living alone who was 65 years of age or older. The average household size was 2.47 and the average family size was 3.04.

In the borough the age distribution of the population shows 19.0% under the age of 18, 7.7% from 18 to 24, 34.0% from 25 to 44, 24.0% from 45 to 64, and 15.3% who were 65 years of age or older. The median age was 39 years. For every 100 females, there were 94.1 males. For every 100 females age 18 and over, there were 92.4 males.

The median income for a household in the borough was $55,058, and the median income for a family was $62,040. Males had a median income of $46,540 versus $36,804 for females. The per capita income for the borough was $28,713. About 3.1% of families and 6.1% of the population were below the poverty line, including 7.8% of those under age 18 and 4.3% of those age 65 or over.

Economy
Corporate residents include:
 Lion Brand Yarns, America's oldest manufacturer of craft yarn.
 Pantone, corporation headquartered in Carlstadt, supplying color space to the printing industry.
 Yoo-hoo, a chocolate drink manufactured by Keurig Dr Pepper.

Government

Local government
Carlstadt is governed under the Borough form of New Jersey municipal government, which is used in 218 municipalities (of the 564) statewide, making it the most common form of government in New Jersey. The governing body is comprised of a Mayor and a Borough Council, with all positions elected at-large on a partisan basis as part of the November general election. A Mayor is elected directly by the voters to a four-year term of office. The Borough Council is comprised of six members elected to serve three-year terms on a staggered basis, with two seats coming up for election each year in a three-year cycle. The borough form of government is a "weak mayor / strong council" government in which council members act as the legislative body with the mayor presiding at meetings and voting only in the event of a tie. The mayor can veto ordinances subject to an override by a two-thirds majority vote of the council. The mayor makes committee and liaison assignments for council members, and most appointments are made by the mayor with the advice and consent of the council.

, the mayor of Carlstadt is Republican Robert J. "Bob" Zimmermann, whose term of office ends December 31, 2023. Members of the Borough Council are Diane DeBiase (R, 2024), Joseph T. Emerson (R, 2023), Suzanne M. Fonseca (R, 2025), James A. Lenoy (R, 2023), William J. Roseman (R, 2024) and David A. Stoltz (R, 2025).

In January 2014, Joseph Emerson was appointed from among three nominees offered to fill the vacant seat of Dennis Ritchie that was scheduled to expire in December 2014.

Carlstadt and Wallington share a municipal court, which meets in Carlstadt.

Federal, state and county representation
Carlstadt is located in the 9th Congressional District and is part of New Jersey's 36th state legislative district.

Politics
As of March 2011, there were a total of 3,420 registered voters in Carlstadt, of which 897 (26.2% vs. 31.7% countywide) were registered as Democrats, 734 (21.5% vs. 21.1%) were registered as Republicans and 1,788 (52.3% vs. 47.1%) were registered as Unaffiliated. There was one voter registered to another party. Among the borough's 2010 Census population, 55.8% (vs. 57.1% in Bergen County) were registered to vote, including 70.0% of those ages 18 and over (vs. 73.7% countywide).

In the 2016 presidential election, Republican Donald Trump received 1,462 votes (50.9% vs. 41.1% countywide), ahead of Democrat Hillary Clinton with 1,289 votes (44.8% vs. 54.2% countywide) and other candidates with 124 votes (4.3% vs. 4.6% countywide), among the 2,924 votes cast by the borough's 3,860 registered voters for a turnout of 75.7% (vs. 72.5% in Bergen County). In the 2012 presidential election, Democrat Barack Obama received 1,416 votes (53.5% vs. 54.8% countywide), ahead of Republican Mitt Romney with 1,165 votes (44.0% vs. 43.5%) and other candidates with 34 votes (1.3% vs. 0.9%), among the 2,646 ballots cast by the borough's 3,663 registered voters, for a turnout of 72.2% (vs. 70.4% in Bergen County). In the 2008 presidential election, Republican John McCain received 1,481 votes (51.9% vs. 44.5% countywide), ahead of Democrat Barack Obama with 1,316 votes (46.1% vs. 53.9%) and other candidates with 34 votes (1.2% vs. 0.8%), among the 2,854 ballots cast by the borough's 3,707 registered voters, for a turnout of 77.0% (vs. 76.8% in Bergen County). In the 2004 presidential election, Republican George W. Bush received 1,414 votes (49.7% vs. 47.2% countywide), ahead of Democrat John Kerry with 1,377 votes (48.4% vs. 51.7%) and other candidates with 33 votes (1.2% vs. 0.7%), among the 2,845 ballots cast by the borough's 3,696 registered voters, for a turnout of 77.0% (vs. 76.9% in the whole county).

In the 2013 gubernatorial election, Republican Chris Christie received 60.5% of the vote (997 cast), ahead of Democrat Barbara Buono with 38.1% (628 votes), and other candidates with 1.4% (23 votes), among the 1,694 ballots cast by the borough's 3,520 registered voters (46 ballots were spoiled), for a turnout of 48.1%. In the 2009 gubernatorial election, Republican Chris Christie received 942 votes (50.2% vs. 45.8% countywide), ahead of Democrat Jon Corzine with 773 votes (41.2% vs. 48.0%), Independent Chris Daggett with 115 votes (6.1% vs. 4.7%) and other candidates with 15 votes (0.8% vs. 0.5%), among the 1,878 ballots cast by the borough's 3,551 registered voters, yielding a 52.9% turnout (vs. 50.0% in the county).

Education
Public school students in pre-kindergarten through eighth grade are served by the Carlstadt Public Schools. As of the 2018–19 school year, the district, comprised of one school, had an enrollment of 562 students and 45.0 classroom teachers (on an FTE basis), for a student–teacher ratio of 12.5:1. With the opening of the Carlstadt Public School in 2007, which now serves all of Carlstadt's K–8 students, the Lincoln and Washington school sites have been turned over to the borough and plans have been developed to convert the sites to senior housing.

For ninth through twelfth grades, public school students attend the Henry P. Becton Regional High School in East Rutherford, which serves high school students from both Carlstadt and East Rutherford as part of the Carlstadt-East Rutherford Regional School District. As of the 2018–19 school year, the high school had an enrollment of 491 students and 37.2 classroom teachers (on an FTE basis), for a student–teacher ratio of 13.2:1. Seats on the high school district's nine-member board of education are allocated based on the population of the constituent municipalities, with four seats allocated to Carlstadt.

Public school students from the borough, and all of Bergen County, are eligible to attend the secondary education programs offered by the Bergen County Technical Schools, which include the Bergen County Academies in Hackensack, and the Bergen Tech campus in Teterboro or Paramus. The district offers programs on a shared-time or full-time basis, with admission based on a selective application process and tuition covered by the student's home school district.

Emergency services

Police
The Carlstadt Police Department is headed by Police Chief Thomas Cox. The department's first chief, Charles Schmidt, was appointed in 1907.

Fire
The Carlstadt Fire Department (CFD) is an all-volunteer fire department. The CFD was organized in March 1872 and consists of one Chief, one assistant chief, one deputy chief and one battalion chief. The department is staffed by 80 fully trained firefighters. The CFD utilizes three engines, a ladder truck, a heavy rescue vehicle and a boat. The Chief of the Department for 2022 is Matt Moran, Assistant Chief is John Harr, Deputy Chief is Bob Ruff, and Battalion Chief is James Schmidt.

Ambulance
Emergency medical services are provided in the borough by the Carlstadt Volunteer Ambulance Corps (CVAC), established on January 1, 1974. The charitable organization has roughly 25 volunteer members on the roster (Emergency Medical Technicians and First Responders). CVAC is led by a corps voted Captain and Lieutenant, and are managed by a Board of Officers composed solely of corps members. CVAC is part of NJ's First Aid Council, District 24. CVAC is based out of a borough-owned building at 424 Hackensack Street. They currently operate two Ford ambulances and a Ford utility vehicle, also owned by the Borough. CVAC responds to approximately 1,500 emergency calls per year.

Transportation

Roads and highways

Route 120, County Route 503, and the western spur of the New Jersey Turnpike (Interstate 95) serve Carlstadt. No interchange from the turnpike directly serves Carlstadt, but there is an entry and exit point for the Meadowlands Sports Complex. The 18W high-speed tollgate is located in the borough, but the nearest turnpike interchange is in East Rutherford.

Public transportation
NJ Transit bus service is available to and from the Port Authority Bus Terminal in Midtown Manhattan on the 161, 163 and 164 routes; to Newark on the 76; and to other New Jersey communities served on the 703 and 772 routes.

Carlstadt once had a rail station on the Hackensack and New York Railroad (later reformed as the New Jersey and New York Railroad), which closed in 1967, and was located on tracks that are used by NJ Transit's Pascack Valley Line.

Notable people

People who were born in, residents of, or otherwise closely associated with Carlstadt include:

 Ernest Cuneo (1905–1988), professional football player, lawyer, newspaperman, author and spy
 Mark DeRosa (born 1975), baseball analyst and retired MLB third baseman / outfielder
 Dutch Dorman (1902–1988), long-time minor league baseball player and manager who was a scout for the Philadelphia Phillies and Atlanta Braves
 Robert P. Hollenbeck (1931–2021), politician who served six terms in the New Jersey General Assembly from the 36th Legislative District
 Darren Lemke (born 1969/1970), screenwriter who co-wrote the 2010 film Shrek Forever After and director of the 2004 thriller film Lost, which he also wrote
 Lou Lombardo (1928–2001), MLB pitcher who appeared in two games for the New York Giants in 1948
 Marc Rizzo (born 1977), lead guitarist of Brazilian metal band Soulfly
 Pete Rohrman (born 1970), operations manager and political activist
 Vito Trause (1925–2019), World War II United States Army veteran and prisoner of war

References

Sources

 Clayton, W. Woodford; and Nelson, Nelson. History of Bergen and Passaic Counties, New Jersey, with Biographical Sketches of Many of its Pioneers and Prominent Men. Philadelphia: Everts and Peck, 1882.
 Harvey, Cornelius Burnham (ed.), Genealogical History of Hudson and Bergen Counties, New Jersey. New York: New Jersey Genealogical Publishing Co., 1900.
 Van Valen, James M. History of Bergen County, New Jersey. New York: New Jersey Publishing and Engraving Co., 1900.
 Westervelt, Frances A. (Frances Augusta), 1858–1942, History of Bergen County, New Jersey, 1630–1923, Lewis Historical Publishing Company, 1923.
 Municipal Incorporations of the State of New Jersey (according to Counties) prepared by the Division of Local Government, Department of the Treasury (New Jersey); December 1, 1958.

External links

 Carlstadt Borough website
 Carlstadt Today
 Carlstadt News

 
1894 establishments in New Jersey
Borough form of New Jersey government
Boroughs in Bergen County, New Jersey
New Jersey Meadowlands District
Populated places established in 1894